William Erwood Old Jr. usually known as Bill Old, (14 April 1928 in Norfolk, Virginia – 31 December 1982 in New York City) was an American malacologist.

He attended The College of William & Mary in Virginia. He served in the army during the Korean War.

He joined the American Museum of Natural History in 1960. He helped build the American Museum's mollusc collection into a leading research resource. He was the first collections manager in malacology at the American Museum of Natural History.

He became a specialist in marine molluscs. He was extremely devoted to his science and was well known as a shell show judge in many parts of the United States. He went on several expeditions including ones to the Galapagos and Mexico.

Old was president of the American Malacological Society from 1978 to 1979, and president of the New York Shell Club from 1963 to 1965.

He died of a heart attack in 1982.

Bibliography 
He authored or co-authored 36 papers. As junior author to William K. Emerson, he named several species of marine mollusks, including:

 Cymatium perryi Emerson & Old, 1963 - a sea snail or marine gastropod

References
This article incorporates public domain text from the reference

Further reading
 Raeihle D. & Emerson W. K. (1983). "In memorium: William Erwood Old Jr., April 14, 1928 - December 31, 1982". American Malacological Bulletin 1: 75-78.
 Raeihle D. & Emerson W. K. (1983). "William Erwood Old Jr. 1928-1982". Of Sea & Shore 13(1): 41-42 [reprinted from New York Shell Club Notes, no. 286, Mar 1983]
 AMNH biography here including photo

American malacologists
1928 births
1982 deaths
College of William & Mary alumni
People associated with the American Museum of Natural History
20th-century American zoologists